Mahikeng Local Municipality is a local municipality in Ngaka Modiri Molema District Municipality, Capital City of North West Province, South Africa. Mahikeng is a Setswana name meaning "place of rocks".

Main places
The 2001 census divided the municipality into the following main places:

Politics 

The municipal council consists of sixty-nine members elected by mixed-member proportional representation. Thirty-five councillors are elected by first-past-the-post voting in thirty-five wards, while the remaining thirty-four are chosen from party lists so that the total number of party representatives is proportional to the number of votes received. In the election of 1 November 2021 the African National Congress (ANC) won a majority of forty seats on the council.

The following table shows the results of the election.

References

External links
 http://www.mafikeng.gov.za/

Local municipalities of the Ngaka Modiri Molema District Municipality